The 2004 United States presidential election in Washington took place on November 2, 2004, and was part of the 2004 United States presidential election. Voters chose 11 representatives, or electors to the Electoral College, who voted for president and vice president.

The State of Washington was considered a competitive swing state in 2004, and on election day, Kerry won the state with a margin of 7.2%. This is the most recent presidential election in which Washington was considered a swing state. , this remains the last time the state's margin of victory was in single digits and the last time a Republican received more than 45% of the state's vote. This also remains the only time in history that a Republican has been re-elected president without carrying Washington.

Caucuses
 2004 Washington Democratic presidential caucuses

Campaign

Predictions
There were 12 news organizations who made state-by-state predictions of the election. Here are their last predictions before election day.

 D.C. Political Report: Solid Democrat
 Associated Press: Solid Kerry
 CNN: Kerry
Cook Political Report: Solid Democrat
 Newsweek: Solid Kerry
New York Times: Solid Kerry
 Rasmussen Reports: Kerry
 Research 2000: Solid Kerry
Washington Post: Kerry
Washington Times: Solid Kerry
Zogby International: Kerry
 Washington Dispatch: Kerry

Polling
Kerry won every single pre-election except one tie. The final 3 poll average had Kerry winning with 50% to 45%.

Fundraising
Bush raised $3,263,363. Kerry raised $5,337,921.

Advertising and visits
Neither campaign advertised or visited this state during the fall election.

Analysis
A Democratic leaning swing state at the time, Washington has voted for the Democratic presidential nominee in every presidential election since 1988. Like Oregon, the state is divided politically by the urban/rural divide and geographically by the Cascade Mountains. Most of the state's population resides in Western Washington along the Pacific Coast and in highly urbanized areas like Seattle; this part of the state votes overwhelmingly Democratic. The other side of the mountains in Eastern Washington is much more rural and conservative and therefore heavily Republican. While polling showed that voters trusted Bush more than Kerry on the issue of terrorism, the Iraq War and Bush's domestic policies were unpopular in the state. , this is the last election in which Clark County, Island County, and Skagit County voted for the Republican candidate.

Results

By county

Counties that flipped from Republican to Democratic
Whatcom (Largest city: Bellingham)

By congressional district
Kerry won 6 of 9 congressional districts. Both candidates won a district held by the other party.

Electors

Technically the voters of Washington cast their ballots for electors: representatives to the Electoral College. Washington is allocated 11 electors because it has 9 congressional districts and 2 senators. All candidates who appear on the ballot or qualify to receive write-in votes must submit a list of 11 electors, who pledge to vote for their candidate and his or her running mate. Whoever wins the majority of votes in the state is awarded all 11 electoral votes. Their chosen electors then vote for president and vice president. Although electors are pledged to their candidate and running mate, they are not obligated to vote for them. An elector who votes for someone other than his or her candidate is known as a faithless elector.

The electors of each state and the District of Columbia met on December 13, 2004, to cast their votes for president and vice president. The Electoral College itself never meets as one body. Instead the electors from each state and the District of Columbia met in their respective capitols.

The following were the members of the Electoral College from the state. All 11 were pledged for Kerry/Edwards:
David Peterson
Mary Ervin
Valeria Ogden
Patsy Whitefoot
Larry Armstrong
Ken Bumgarner
Richard Kelley
Sarah Chandler
Greg Markley
Alan Johanson
Mary Crosby

See also
 United States presidential elections in Washington (state)
 Presidency of George W. Bush

References

Washington (state)
2004
Presidential